Jamie Blamire (born 22 December 1997) is an English professional rugby union player who plays as a hooker for Newcastle Falcons in Premiership Rugby.

Early life
Blamire was born in Seaton, Cumbria to
parents Graeme, a conservatory builder and Julie Tinnion. He has a younger sister called Gemma. He started his rugby career as part of Seaton Rangers RLFC.

Rugby playing career
Blamire came through the Newcastle Academy to sign a first-team deal, and subsequent extensions. In May 2019 he scored a try on his Premiership debut against Gloucester. He is seen as an unusually attacking force for his position.

Blamire scored a try for the England U20 team  against Italy during the 2017 Six Nations Under 20s Championship and also featured in the final game against Ireland as England completed the grand slam. He was also a member of the squad that finished runners up to New Zealand at the 2017 World Rugby Under 20 Championship. In June 2021 he was selected by Eddie Jones for the senior England team and on 4 July 2021 scored a try on his debut against the United States at Twickenham. The following weekend saw him score a hat-trick of tries on his first start in a victory against Canada.

International tries

References

External links
Newcastle Falcons Profile
ESPN Profile
Ultimate Rugby Profile

1997 births
Living people
England international rugby union players
English rugby union players
Newcastle Falcons players
People educated at Gosforth Academy
Rugby union hookers
Rugby union players from Seaton, Cumbria